The canton of Vermand is a former administrative division in northern France. It was disbanded following the French canton reorganisation which came into effect in March 2015. It consisted of 24 communes, which joined the new canton of Saint-Quentin-1 in 2015. It had 9,663 inhabitants (2012). 

The canton comprised the following communes:

Attilly
Beauvois-en-Vermandois
Caulaincourt
Douchy
Étreillers
Fayet
Fluquières
Foreste
Francilly-Selency
Germaine
Gricourt
Holnon
Jeancourt
Lanchy
Maissemy
Pontru
Pontruet
Roupy
Savy
Trefcon
Vaux-en-Vermandois
Vendelles
Le Verguier
Vermand

Demographics

See also
Cantons of the Aisne department 
Communes of France

References

Former cantons of Aisne
2015 disestablishments in France
States and territories disestablished in 2015